Tinemu-ye Olya (also Romanized as Tīnemū-ye ‘Olyā, Tīnemū-e ‘Olyā, Tīnamū ‘Olyā, and Tīnamū-ye ‘Olyā; also known as Tappeh Mey and Tīnamū) is a village in Dinavar Rural District, Dinavar District, Sahneh County, Kermanshah Province, Iran. At the 2006 census, its population was 130, in 33 families.

References 

Populated places in Sahneh County